0R (1000 r) or 0-R may refer to:

0r, an object with a radius of zero
0-rated supply, or Zero-rated supply, items that are not charged a tax on their input supplies
0 risk bias, or Zero-risk bias, irrationally valuing complete elimination of a risk, to a reduction in a greater risk
0r, a Zero rupee note
0 reference pulse, or Zero reference pulse an artificially produced pulse in a television receiver
zero ohm(Ω) (electric) resistance for representing a Resistor component with zero ohm in electronic circuit board design diagram document. For more see Zero-ohm link.

See also
R0 (disambiguation)